North End Road is a street in West Kensington and Fulham, in the London Borough of Hammersmith and Fulham.

It starts at Hammersmith Road (the A315), close to the Olympia exhibition centre, and runs south to Fulham Road (the A304), near Fulham Broadway. Its main junctions are with the A4 at West Kensington tube station, and with Lillie Road near the Clem Attlee Estate.

The street is signed as the B317 for its entire length except for the short final section between Dawes Road and Fulham Road, which is part of the A3219.

South of Lillie Road, there is the North End Road street market, which has been in operation since the late 19th century.

References

External links
 

Fulham
Streets in the London Borough of Hammersmith and Fulham
History of the London Borough of Hammersmith and Fulham